Cesny-aux-Vignes is a commune in the Calvados department in the Normandy region in northwestern France.

On 1 January 1972, Ouézy and Cesny-aux-Vignes were amalgamated to become the commune of Cesny-aux-Vignes-Ouézy, but on 1 January 2006, Ouézy and Cesny-aux-Vignes were re-established as two separate communes.

See also
Communes of the Calvados department

References

Communes of Calvados (department)
Calvados communes articles needing translation from French Wikipedia